T. and T. is a television series, in production from 1987 to 1990. It premiered in first-run syndication in January 1988, moving to new episodes on the Family Channel in 1990. It is a starring vehicle for Mr. T, after the cancellation of The A-Team in 1987. It was co-produced by Canadian animation firm Nelvana (in one of its few live-action productions), alongside Hal Roach Studios and successor Qintex Entertainment.

The theme song was performed by Merry Clayton.

Plot
The opening voice-over has the premise.

The regular cast includes Mr. T, Alex Amini as Amanda "Amy" Taler, Kristina Nicoll as Terri Taler (who replaced her sister as Turner's new partner in 1990), and David Nerman as Danforth "Dick" Decker, the owner of the gym where T.S. boxes and, eventually, set his own headquarters. Other cast include Taler's secretary Sophie (Catherine Disher); Det. Jones (Ken James), who sometimes work alongside Turner and Taler; and in season two, teenage orphan Joe Casper (Sean Roberge), who lives with Decker.

For the first two seasons, Turner lives with his Aunt Martha (Jackie Richardson) and teenage cousin Renee (Rachael Crawford), upon getting out of jail and cleaning up his life. In the third season, a new detective, Dick Hargrove (David Hemblen) assists the team.

Release
T. and T. is on Amazon, Tubi, and Nelvana's official YouTube channel Retro Rerun. It is currently rerunning on Adult Swim since January 2, 2023.

Episodes

Season 1: 1988

Season 2: 1988–89

Season 3: 1990
 "Cracked" (1990.01.06) - Teleplay by: D. J. Fordham, Story by: D. J. Fordham and Patrick Loubert, directed by Don McCutcheon
 "Hargrove's Call" (1990.01.13) - Teleplay by: Richard Oleksiak, Story by: Richard Oleksiak and Patrick Loubert, directed by Don McCutcheon
 "Halfway to Nowhere" (1990.01.20) - Teleplay by: Richard Oleksiak, Story by: Richard Oleksiak and Patrick Loubert, directed by Don McCutcheon
 "Cry Wolf" (air date: 1990.01.27) - written by Guy Mullaly, directed by Alan Simmonds - A film student tries to prove she caught a crime on camera.
 "Decker's Ex" (1990.02.03) - written by Richard Oleksiak, directed by Ken Girotti
 "Take My Life, Please" (1990.02.10) - Teleplay by: Tim Simms, Story by: Toby Mullaly, directed by Alan Simmonds
 "A Lesson in Values" (1990.02.17) - Teleplay by: Richard Oleksiak, Story by: Patrick Loubert and Richard Oleksiak, directed by Clay Borris
 "The Mysterious Mauler" (1990.02.24) - Teleplay by: Toby Mullaly, Story by: Patrick Loubert and Toby Mullaly, directed by Alan Simmonds
 "Movie Madness" (1990.03.03) - Teleplay by: Toby Mullaly, Story by: John Ryan and Toby Mullaly, directed by Don McCutcheon
 "Silent Witness" (air date: 1990.03.10) - Teleplay by: Marlene Matthews, Story by: Patrick Loubert, directed by Alan Simmonds - Turner is charged with protecting a deaf boy who is a witness to a robbery.
 "A Place in History" (1990.03.17) - written by J. D. Smith, directed by Alan Simmonds
 "Thief of Hearts" (1990.03.24) - Teleplay by: J. D. Smith, Story by: Toby Mullaly, directed by Don McCutcheon
 "The Curse" (1990.03.31) - Teleplay by: D. J. Fordham, Story by: D. J. Fordham and Toby Mullaly, directed by Patrick Loubert
 "Mr. Big" (1990.04.07) - Teleplay by: Renata Bright, Story by: Patrick Loubert and Renata Bright, directed by Don McCutcheon
 "Butler Duet" (1990.04.14) - Teleplay by: David Finley, Story by: John Ryan and Toby Mullaly, directed by Don McCutcheon
 "T. V. Turner" (1990.04.21) - Teleplay by: Richard Oleksiak, Story by: Patrick Loubert and Richard Oleksiak, directed by Patrick Loubert
 "Nightmare" (1990.04.28) - written by Jerome McCann, directed by Don McCutcheon
 "Suspect" (1990.05.05) - Teleplay by: D. J. Fordham, Story by: Patrick Loubert and D. J. Fordham, directed by Ken Girotti
 "Turner's Tale" (1990.05.12) - Teleplay by: Toby Mullaly, Story by: Patrick Loubert, directed by Patrick Loubert
 "Wild Willy and the Waves" (1990.05.19) - Teleplay by: Renata Bright, Story by: Patrick Loubert and Renata Bright, directed by Don McCutcheon
 "The Little Prince" (1990.05.26) - Teleplay by: Renata Bright, Story by: Patrick Loubert and Renata Bright, directed by Ken Girotti

References

External links
 
 

1980s American crime drama television series
1988 American television series debuts
1990s American crime drama television series
1990 American television series endings
1980s Canadian crime drama television series
1988 Canadian television series debuts
1990s Canadian crime drama television series
1990 Canadian television series endings
First-run syndicated television programs in the United States
First-run syndicated television shows in Canada
English-language television shows
Television series by Tribune Entertainment
Television series by Nelvana
Television shows filmed in Toronto
The Family Channel (American TV network, founded 1990) original programming